Toguchin is a town and the administrative center of Toguchinsky District in Novosibirsk Oblast, Russia, located on the Inya River (Ob's tributary)  east of Novosibirsk, the administrative center of the oblast. Population:

History
It was founded as a village in the 17th century. Town status was granted to it in 1945.

Administrative and municipal status
Within the framework of administrative divisions, Toguchin serves as the administrative center of Toguchinsky District. As an administrative division, it is incorporated within Toguchinsky District as the Town of Toguchin. As a municipal division, the Town of Toguchin is incorporated within Toguchinsky Municipal District as Toguchin Urban Settlement.

Economy
Town's industrial facilities include a water-accumulator installations plant, a wood-processing factory, a fruit-and-vegetable processing plant, a bread-making plant, a beverage plant, a dairy factory, and a hemp-processing plant.

References

Notes

Sources

Cities and towns in Novosibirsk Oblast